RadPHP (formerly Delphi for PHP) was an IDE and rapid application development framework for the PHP programming language developed by Embarcadero Technologies.

The VCL includes many components that can be used dynamically with each other.

It is well integrated with MySQL database as well as Ajax. It is a method for developing Web, Facebook and mobile applications.

The Window component can be used in conjunction with other components to create an interface that is very similar to the Microsoft Windows interface inside a JavaScript compatible web-browser.

References

 VCL for PHP Sourceforge page

Integrated development environments
CodeGear software
PHP software